Fatemeh Rahbar (– 7 March 2020) was an Iranian conservative politician who served three terms as a member of the Iranian Parliament representing Tehran, Rey, Shemiranat, and Eslamshahr. Rahbar was elected to serve in the Parliament for a fourth time, but died before the start of her term.

Life
Rahbar earned a master's degree in visual communication, and a Ph.D. degree in strategic management. She worked as a production manager for the Internet Network and Secretary of the Supreme Council on Internet Policy.

Rahbar was a conservative politician and a member of the Islamic Coalition Party. She served three terms between 2004 and 2016 as a member of the Iranian Parliament, representing Tehran, Rey, Shemiranat, and Eslamshahr. As a member of parliament, Rahbar served as vice president of the Iranian National Commission for UNESCO, chair of the Women's Fraction, and chair of the Media and Art Committee. Rahbar served as deputy head of the Imam Khomeini Relief Foundation. She was elected to serve in the Parliament for the fourth time, but died before the start of her fourth term.

Rahbar went into a coma on 5 March 2020, after contracting COVID-19 during the COVID-19 pandemic in Iran. She died on 7 March 2020 due to complications caused by the disease.

References

1960s births
2020 deaths
Members of the 7th Islamic Consultative Assembly
Members of the 8th Islamic Consultative Assembly
Members of the 9th Islamic Consultative Assembly
Deputies of Tehran, Rey, Shemiranat and Eslamshahr
Alliance of Builders of Islamic Iran politicians
Islamic Coalition Party politicians
Zeynab Society politicians
Members of the Women's fraction of Islamic Consultative Assembly
People from Tehran
Popular Front of Islamic Revolution Forces politicians
21st-century Iranian women politicians
21st-century Iranian politicians
Iranian elected officials who did not take office
Deaths from the COVID-19 pandemic in Iran
Elected officials who died without taking their seats